Lomandra elongata is a perennial, rhizomatous herb found in eastern Australia.

References

elongata
Asparagales of Australia
Flora of Queensland
Flora of New South Wales